Schizothorax grahami is a species of ray-finned fish in the genus Schizothorax. It is endemic to Lake Dianchi, its tributaries and connected springs, in Yunnan Province, China. The species has not been caught in the lake in the past 20 years, but it is present in one tributary drainage basin. The introduction of exotic fish is the main threat to this species.

References 

Schizothorax
Endemic fauna of Yunnan
Freshwater fish of China
Fish described in 1904
Taxa named by Charles Tate Regan